Enzo Mari (27 April 1932 – 19 October 2020) was an Italian modernist artist and furniture designer who is known to have influenced many generations of industrial designers.

Early life and education 
Mari was born in Novara, Italy, and he studied at the Brera Academy in Milan, Italy from 1952 to 1956.

Career 
He drew inspiration from the idealism of the arts and crafts movement and his political views as a communist.

From 1956 onward, he specialized in industrial design and created a portfolio of more than 2,000 works. In the 1960s, he published a series of books, including "The Apple and the Butterfly," a book of illustrations depicting the story of a caterpillar and an apple, without any text.

In the 1970s as a professor at The Humanitarian Society, he founded the Nuova Tendenza art movement in Milan. Also in that decade, he designed the Sof Sof chair and the "Box" chair. In 1974, in reaction to the mass production of furniture, Enzo Mari created a book entitled, Autoprogettazione, which deals with the DIY construction of furniture and provides plans and instructions on how to create 19 items of furniture from ubiquitous materials. In the 1980s, he designed the modernist Tonietta chair.

Mari also taught at University of Parma, the Accademia Carrara, and the Milan Polytechnic.

Multiple works by Mari have been on display at the Museum of Modern Art. He had retrospective shows in Turin, and an important presentation of his work in the "Adhocracy" show, during the first Istanbul Design Biennial. In addition, the Triennale, Milan is exhibiting a tribute to Mari, curated by Hans Ulrich Obrist with Francesca Giacomelli.

He donated the archive of his designs to the city of Milan on the condition that it may not be displayed for 40 years.

Personal life 
Mari married art critic, theoretician and performance artist Lea Vergine,  in 1978. They had known each other since the 1960s. He died from COVID-19 on 19 October 2020, at the age of 88, during the COVID-19 pandemic in Italy. His wife died a day later, also from COVID-19.

Publications 

 "autoprogettazione?", 1974

Awards and recognition
 Compasso d'Oro award:  1967 "for individual research in design" 
 Compasso d'Oro award:  1979 for the "Delfina" chair 
 Compasso d'Oro award:  1987 for the "Tonietta" chair 
 Compasso d'Oro award:  2001 for the "Legato" table 
 The RSA of London presented him with the award of "HonRDI" (Honorary Royal Designer for Industry) in 2000. Only 200 people may hold this title at any time.
 The Faculty of Architecture at Milan Polytechnic presented Mari with an honorary degree in Industrial Design in 2002.

Selected quotes

 "Form is everything."

 "Design is dead."

 "I want to create models for a different society."

References

Italian furniture designers
Compasso d'Oro Award recipients
20th-century Italian male artists
Industrial design
1932 births
2020 deaths
21st-century Italian male artists
Italian communists
People from Novara
Brera Academy alumni
20th-century Italian male writers
21st-century Italian male writers
Academic staff of the University of Parma
Academic staff of the Accademia Carrara di Belle Arti di Bergamo
Academic staff of the Polytechnic University of Milan
Deaths from the COVID-19 pandemic in Lombardy